Malyino is a rural locality (a village) in Sizemskoye Rural Settlement, Sheksninsky District, Vologda Oblast, Russia. The population was 4 as of 2002.

Geography 
Malyino is located 32 km north of Sheksna (the district's administrative centre) by road. Zverinets is the nearest rural locality.

References 

Rural localities in Sheksninsky District